Leonardo "Léo" de Souza Sena (born 31 December 1995) is a Brazilian professional footballer who plays as a Goiás.

Club career
Léo Sena was born in São Paulo, and represented São Paulo, Paraná, Clube Atlético Diadema and Rio Claro as a youth, before joining Goiás in 2015. Promoted to the main squad ahead of the 2016 season, he made his senior debut on 14 February of that year by coming on as a second-half substitute for Carlos Eduardo in a 2–2 Campeonato Goiano home draw against Atlético Goianiense.

Léo Sena scored his first senior goal on 8 May 2016, netting the opener in a 1–1 home draw against Anápolis, for the state league's final; his side went on to win the competition on penalties. He made his Série B debut for the club five days later, starting in a 1–0 away win against Tupi.

On 13 August 2016, Léo Sena renewed his contract with the club until the end of 2019. During the 2018 campaign, he contributed with 13 appearances as his side achieved promotion to Série A.

On 2 June 2020, Goiás announced that they had reached an agreement with Atlético Mineiro for the transfer of Léo Sena for a R$ 4 million fee. Four months later, he joined Spezia in the Italian Serie A on a season-long loan with the option to buy. On 2 June 2021, Sena signed a three-year contract with Spezia for €1,250,000.

Sena tested positive for COVID-19 in July 2021 and in the following month received a diagnosis of myocarditis, missing the entirety of the 2021–22 season as a result. In July 2022, his contract with Spezia was brought to an end on mutual terms.

Career statistics

Honours
Goiás
Campeonato Goiano: 2016, 2017, 2018

Atlético Mineiro
Campeonato Mineiro: 2020

References

External links

1995 births
Living people
Brazilian footballers
Brazilian expatriate footballers
Association football midfielders
Footballers from São Paulo
Campeonato Brasileiro Série A players
Campeonato Brasileiro Série B players
Serie A players
São Paulo FC players
Paraná Clube players
Rio Claro Futebol Clube players
Goiás Esporte Clube players
Clube Atlético Mineiro players
Spezia Calcio players
Brazilian expatriate sportspeople in Italy
Expatriate footballers in Italy